Events in the year 1925 in Belgium.

Incumbents
Monarch – Albert I
Prime Minister – Georges Theunis (to 13 May); Aloys Van de Vyvere (13 May to 17 June); Prosper Poullet (from 17 June)

Events

 6 March – Annexation of Eupen and Malmedy to the Kingdom of Belgium.
 10 March – Parliament passes a law on the provision of electricity.
 5 April
 Legislative elections: Belgian Labour Party and Catholic Party each win 78 seats
 Henri de Baillet-Latour elected President of the International Olympic Committee
 23 April – Monument to the Zeebrugge Raid inaugurated by King Albert I.
 7 June – 14th Gordon Bennett Cup held in Brussels.
 28 June – Antonio Ascari wins the 1925 Belgian Grand Prix, the first held on the Circuit de Spa-Francorchamps.
 19 July – Lucien Buysse comes second in the 1925 Tour de France
 13 October – Gaston-Antoine Rasneur, bishop of Tournai, consecrates the new abbey church of Chimay Abbey.
 8 November – Provincial elections
 December – Flooding in Charleroi

Publications
 Jean Dominique, Sable sans fleurs
 André Fontaine, L'Art belge
 Frans Masereel, La Ville: cent bois gravés
 Joris Minne, Alphabet
 Marcel Thiry, Plongeantes proues

Art and architecture

Buildings
 Major Seminary of Ghent relocates to new buildings (now part of Vlerick Business School)

Births
 7 January – Louis Carré, footballer (died 2002)
 31 January – Micheline Lannoy, Olympic figure skater
 25 February – Gilbert Temmerman, politician (died 2012)
 8 March – Antoine, 13th Prince of Ligne, aristocrat (died 2005)
 21 March – Pierre Celis, brewer (died 2011)
 7 April – Jos De Beukelaere, cyclist (died 1969)
 9 April – Paula Sémer, broadcaster (died 2021)
 11 April – Rik Kuypers, film maker (died 2019)
 8 May
 Dino Attanasio, comics artist
 André-Paul Duchâteau, writer (died 2020)
 16 May – Bobbejaan Schoepen, entertainer (died 2010)
 25 July – Yolande Uyttenhove, pianist (died 2000)
 4 September – Leo Apostel, philosopher (died 1995)
 5 September
Robert Schoonjans, runner (died 2011)
Jos Vandeloo, writer (died 2015)
 16 September – José Desmarets, politician (died 2019)
 25 September – Janine de Greef, Resister (died 2020)
 6 October – Jean Mathonet, footballer (died 2004)
 16 October – Karel Dillen, politician (died 2007)
 25 October – Joseph Michel, politician (died 2016)
 3 December – Paula Marckx, pilot (died 2020)
 20 December – Bob de Moor, comics artist (died 1992)

Deaths
 17 January – Hendrik Geeraert (born 1863), sluice-keeper
 23 February – Joris Helleputte (born 1852), architect and politician
 1 March – Philogène Wytsman (born 1866), biologist
 8 March – Juliette Wytsman (born 1866), painter
 25 March – Thomas Vinçotte (born 1850), sculptor
 9 July – Flavie Van den Hende (born 1865), cellist
 16 August – Jean Massart (born 1865), botanist
 9 September – Eugène Goblet d'Alviella (born 1846), politician

References

 
1920s in Belgium
Belgium
Years of the 20th century in Belgium
Belgium